Nick Sakai is an American actor and producer.  He has been seen in High Maintenance, The Affair, Orange Is The New Black, and other shows.  He produced, directed and starred in his own short films, Ms Kiss and Three Minute Love Affair. His 2010 film 12, a parody of 24, became a YouTube sensation and was premiered at the 2010 Comic-Con. He also associate produced (and acted in) The Professor starring Betsy Brandt and Rick Peters. The film won the Best Action/Adventure short at 2014 San Diego Comic-Con International.

He studied with Suzanne Shepherd (Requiem for a Dream, The Sopranos), Maggie Flanigan at William Esper Studio, James Price, Loyd Williamson and Larry Moss.

On stage, he appeared in Off Broadway production of "The Shanghai Gesture", produced by Mirror Repertory Company, directed by Robert Kalfin, starring Tina Chen and Larry Pine plus many others in New York City.

Filmography
 Guiding Light (1997) as a Delivery worker
 As the World Turns (1999) as a Vendor in the Park
 The Accountant (2001) as Vanessa's Driver
 Law & Order: Criminal Intent (2004) as Detective Tanaka
 Third Watch (2004) as an NYPD anti-crime agent
 Telling Tales (2005) as Tom Lee
 Three Minute Love Affair (2006) as Charles Ohara
 College Road Trip (2008) as Singer
 The Taking of Pelham 123 (2009) as Paramedic
 Shanghai (2009) as ADR voice artist
 12 (2010) as Goro (premiered at 2010 Comic-Con)
 The Raft (2011) as Japanese Sailor #1
 Couch (2011) as Huang Loi
 The Professor (2013) as Viewer #3 (also served as Associate Producer)
 Orange Is The New Black (2016, Season 4) as Happy Clappy Waiter #3
 The Affair (2016, Season 3) as Anesthesiologist
 Docket 32357 (2017, Season 2) as Father Morrison
 High Maintenance (2018, Season 2) as Actor
 Big Dogs (2020) as Street Preacher
 Bashira (film) (2021) as Driver
 Heather (2022?) as Officer Dan

External links
 
  (official site)
  (Twitter)
  (Instagram)

People from Osaka
Year of birth missing (living people)
Japanese emigrants to the United States
Living people
American male actors of Japanese descent
American male television actors
20th-century American male actors
21st-century American male actors
American male film actors
American film actors of Asian descent